St. John's Anglican Church  is a historic Carpenter Gothic style Anglican church building located at 8 Church Road in Peggys Cove, Nova Scotia, Canada. Built in 1893–94 of wood, St. John's is the only church in Peggys Cove. Its steep pitched roof, board and batten siding and lancet windows are typical of Carpenter Gothic churches.  The church contains two murals painted in 1963 by noted Canadian artist and local resident William E. deGarthe.

St. John's is a municipally registered heritage site within the Halifax Regional Municipality as designated on February 22, 1993. The designation encompasses both the church building and the land on which it is located.

St. John's is part of St. Peter's Parish in the Anglican Diocese of Nova Scotia and Prince Edward Island. St. John's is open for visitors 6 days a week from June till October, staffed by volunteers. The current Priest-in-Charge of the parish (St Peter's, Hackett's Cove) is the Rev'd Taunya Dawson, MA, MDiv.

References

External link
 Parish of St. Peter's Church

Anglican church buildings in Nova Scotia
19th-century Anglican church buildings in Canada
Carpenter Gothic church buildings in Nova Scotia
Heritage sites in Nova Scotia
Churches in Halifax, Nova Scotia
Churches completed in 1894
1894 establishments in Nova Scotia